Kopito may refer to:
 Kopito Ridge, Antarctica
 Kopito (Višegrad), Bosnia and Herzegovina
 Kopito, Danilovgrad, Montenegro